Eutropis dattaroyi is a species of skink found on Great Nicobar Island in India.

References

Eutropis
Reptiles described in 2020
Reptiles of India
Endemic fauna of India